Ballymoe (historically Bellamoe, from ) is a village in County Galway, Ireland. Ballymoe is situated on the western side of the River Suck that separates counties Galway and Roscommon. The N60 national secondary road meets the R360 regional road in the centre of the village.

History
The name Béal Átha Mó is derived from a fort which was built by Meabh of Connacht, under the order of Mogh. The fort and village would later become known as Átha Mogh Mór and Béal Átha Mogh. The town is now the centre of a small rural area involved in scale mixed farming. Raised bogs, forts and a mass rock from penal times are features of Ballymoe today.

People
Éamonn Ceannt, one of the leaders of the Easter Rising and signatory to the Proclamation of the Irish Republic was born in the police barracks in Ballymoe where his father James Kent, an officer in the Royal Irish Constabulary was stationed. The Garda Síochána barracks in the town today is named in his honour.
Fr. Edward J. Flanagan, founder of Boys Town, Nebraska, was born here
Thomas Charles Beirne, Australian businessman, politician and philanthropist, was born nearby.
James Daly, executed in 1920 for his role in the Connaught Rangers mutiny in India, was born in Ballymoe in 1899.

See also
 List of towns and villages in Ireland

References

Towns and villages in County Galway